Hugh Daniel Davies (23 July 1932 – 2 December 2017) was a Welsh cricketer. Davies was a right-handed batsman who bowled right-arm medium-fast. He was born at Pembrey, Carmarthenshire.

After retiring from cricket, Davies became a physical education teacher. In the 1980s he was a summariser for BBC Radio Cymru during their Welsh-language coverage of Glamorgan's games. He worked for the Cricket Board of Wales from its inception in 1997, and served as its Chairman between 2002 and 2011.

References

External links
Hugh Davies at ESPNcricinfo
Hugh Davies at CricketArchive

1932 births
2017 deaths
Cricketers from Carmarthenshire
Glamorgan cricketers
Welsh cricket administrators
Welsh cricket commentators
Welsh cricketers